The Polytech Group (Réseau des écoles Polytech, or Écoles polytechniques, in French) is a French network of 15 public graduate schools of engineering (Grandes Écoles) within France's leading technological universities: 
 15 schools + 4 partner schools
 over 100 engineering majors
 17,500 students
 3800 graduates p.a.
 1350 doctoral students
All the schools in the group offer are accredited by the Commission des Titres d'Ingénieur (CTI) to award the French Diplôme d'Ingénieur in various specialties. In France, engineering studies are organized according to framework of the European Higher Education Area; the  French engineering degree is a master's degree obtained after validation of 300 ECTS credits.

List of schools and engineering majors 

Polytech Angers

Polytech Annecy-Chambery

Polytech Clermont-Ferrand
Biology
Civil Engineering
Electrical Engineering
Mathematics and Mathematical modelling
Physics

Polytech Grenoble
Computer Science, Network and Multimedia Communication
Electronics
Geotechnics and Civil Engineering
Materials Science
 Risks Prevention Science
 Health Technology Information

Polytech Lille
Mechanical Engineering
Software Engineering and Statistics
Geotechnics and Civil Engineering
Geomatics and Urban Engineering
Biological and Food Engineering
Electrical and Computer Engineering
Measurement Systems and Applied Business
Materials Science
Production System - Operations Engineering

Polytech Lyon
Computer Science Engineering
Materials Science and Engineering
Applied Mathematics and Modeling
Mechanical Engineering
Biomedical Engineering
Industrial systems and Robotics (Roanne)

Polytech Marseille

Polytech Montpellier
Computer Science and Management
Materials Science and Engineering
Electrical Engineering
Water Science and Engineering
Energetic - Renewables Energies
Food Science and Engineering
Mechanical Engineering and Interaction
Energectics and Renewable Energies

Polytech Nancy

Polytech Nantes
Masters of engineering science
Electronics and digital technologies (Nantes)
Electrical engineering (Saint-Nazaire)
Civil Engineering  (Saint-Nazaire)
Process and Bioprocess engineering  (Saint-Nazaire)
Engineering Computer Science  (Nantes)
Materials Science (Nantes)
Thermal science (Nantes)
Energy and Mechanics (Saint-Nazaire)
Information systems, networks and telecommunications (La Roche-sur-Yon)
Masters of engineering science
Computer sciences (data science, visual computing)
Automatics, electronics, electrical energy (electrical, wireless,embedded technologies)
Mechanics (thermal science, energy)
Process and bioprocess engineering ( Microalgae Bioprocess Engineering)

Polytech Nice Sophia
Electronics
Computer Science
Bioteechnology
Applied Mathematics and Mathematical modelling

Polytech Orléans
Mechanical Engineering
Electronics and Optics
Civil Engineering
Production
Building Intelligence

Polytech Paris Saclay
Electronics and Board Systems
Computer Sciences
Optronics
Materials Science

Polytech Sorbonne (formerly Polytech Paris-UPMC)
Electronics and Computer Sciences
Geotechnics and Geophysics (Earth Sciences)
Robotics
Industrial Computing
Industrial Mechanics
Agribusiness
Materials Chemistry

Polytech Tours
Electronics
Computer Science

Partner schools 
In 2021, four schools are associated to Polytech Group. They share the same values, but a different admission process.

 ENSIM (Le Mans)
 ESGT Le CNAM (Le Mans)
 ISEL (Le Havre)
 ESIREM (Dijon)

References

External links 
 

Education in France